The Ravine is a 1969 Italian-Yugoslav-American war drama film written and directed  by Paolo Cavara and starring  David McCallum, Nicoletta Machiavelli and John Crawford.

Plot
The story takes place in winter, during World War II, at an isolated, snowed-in area.  This area is occupied by Germany but contested by partisans who have Russian backing.

One of the local partisans is Anja Kovach (Nicoletta Machiavelli).  Her entire family was executed in retaliation for the death of a single German.  She survived and, eventually, joined the partisans.  She has become renowned as a sniper.  She has killed almost half the local German garrison.  The German troops live in fear of her.

Sergeant Stephen Holmann (David McCallum) is an expert sniper in the German army.  Before the war, he worked as a teacher. He attended the 1936 Olympics, an expert in marksmanship and a hunter.  He gets reassigned from North Africa, and parachuted into the area, for a special assignment: to capture Anja.  He must not kill her, lest she become a martyr.

For several days, Stephen and Anja stalk each other through snow and woods.  Eventually, Stephen wins: he manages to capture Anja, whilst she is occupied with signalling a Russian supply plane.

Simultaneously, a fierce battle erupts between Germans and partisans.  The battle moves away, leaving Stephen and Anja alone, without supplies, and surrounded by dead bodies.

Stephen, with Anja his captive, is forced to find shelter and food, in hopes that the German forces will prevail and return.  As days pass, Stephen and Anja's relationship evolves from adversarial to cooperative.  They become lovers.

Subsequently, the battle returns to the area.  Amidst flying bullets, Stephen returns Anja's rifle to her.  They go in opposite directions but a German soldier spots Anja and kills her.  Stephen sees this, and kills the soldier.  A Russian soldier sees Stephen heading toward Anja and assumes he has shot her, and in retaliation, kills Stephen.

Cast    
 David McCallum as Sergeant Stephen Holmann
 Nicoletta Machiavelli as Anja Kovach
 John Crawford as Captain Keller
 Lars Bloch as Lt. Alexei Soloviev
 Demeter Bitenc as Lt. Eisgruber
 Lewis W. Bushnell  as Corporal Busch 
 Tana Mascarelli as First Old Woman
 Ivona Petri  as Second Old woman
 Branko Špoljar as Thin Soldier  
 Mirko Boman as Tall Soldier
 Rikard Brzeska as Old Soldier

References

External links

The Ravine at Variety Distribution

1960s war drama films
Films directed by Paolo Cavara
Films scored by Riz Ortolani
Italian multilingual films
English-language Italian films
Italian war drama films
1960s multilingual films
War films set in Partisan Yugoslavia
Films about anti-fascism
American multilingual films
American World War II films
Italian World War II films
Films about snipers
1960s American films
1960s Italian films